Table Tennis Victoria (TTV) is the State Sporting Organisation for the Sport of Table Tennis in Victoria.

TTV was formed in 1925. 

It is affiliated with TTA (Table Tennis Australia), the ITTF (International Table Tennis Federation) and the OTTF (Oceania Table Tennis Federation).

TTV has over 4,500 registered members. Members have represented Australia in Olympic Games, Paralympic GamesCommonwealth Games, Able Bodied and Para World Championships, the World Cup and numerous other international competitions; including junior, youth and veteran levels. At the 2000 Sydney Olympic Games Victoria's Miao Miao earned fifth place and took Silver at the 2002 Manchester Commonwealth Games. While at the 2002 Manchester Commonwealth Games Jian Fang Lay captured two Silver and one Bronze medal for Australia. Jiang Fang Lay also combined with Miao Miao to win a Silver medal in the women's doubles and a Bronze medal in the women's teams event at the 2014 Commonwealth Games.

Players 
Women:
 Jian Fang Lay
 Stephanie Sang

Men:
 David Zalcberg
 Simon Gerada

State Tournament Circuit 
TTV sanctions multiple tournaments around Victoria throughout the year. There are Junior Tournaments, Senior Tournaments and Veteran Tournaments.

Division Events are restricted by Rating Central points

Members Associations 

 Aintree Table Tennis Club
 Albert Park Table Tennis Association
 Albury Wodonga Table Tennis Association
 Ballarat Table Tennis Association
 Balwyn United Table Tennis Club
 Bellarine Table Tennis Club
 Bellarine Keenagers Table Tennis Club
 Bendigo & District Table Tennis Association
 Braybrook and Maribyrnong Community Youth and Table Tennis Club
 CH Table Tennis
 Cobram Skillzone Table Tennis
 Coburg Table Tennis Club
 Croydon & Districts Table Tennis Association
 Daylesford Table Tennis Association
 Eastern Suburbs & Churches Table Tennis Association
 Geelong Table Tennis Association
 Gisborne District Table Tennis Association
 Greater Dandenong Table Tennis Association
 Hamilton Table Tennis Association
 Horsham Table Tennis Association
 Knox Indoor Table Tennis
 Kyabram Youth Club
 Lakes Entrance Keenagers
 Leongatha Table Tennis Association
 LOOPS powered by HWATT
 Maccabi Table Tennis Club
 Manningham Table Tennis Association
 Melbourne Veterans Table Tennis Association
 Melton Table Tennis Association
 Miao’s Table Tennis Academy
 Monbulk Table Tennis Association 
 Mornington Frankston Table Tennis Association
 Orbost Table Tennis Association
 Orford & Districts Table Tennis Association
 Portland Table Tennis Association
 Sale Keenagers Table Tennis Club
 Shepparton Table Tennis Association
 South Eastern Table Tennis Association
 St Kilda Cricket Club Table Tennis Club
 Sunbury & District Table Tennis Association
 Sunraysia Table Tennis Association
 Sunshine & District Table Tennis Association
 Swan Hill Table Tennis Association
 Tarneit Table Tennis Club
 Terang Table Tennis Association
 Traralgon Table Tennis Association
 Triangle Table Tennis
 Vietnamese Table Tennis Association
 Wangaratta Table Tennis Association
 Warracknabeal Table Tennis Association
 Warrnambool Table Tennis Association
 Werribee Table Tennis Association
 Wonthaggi Table Tennis Association
 Yarra Table Tennis Club
 Yarrawonga Mulwala Table Tennis Association

See also
 TTV Super League

References

External links 
Table Tennis Victoria Website

Table tennis organizations
Table tennis in Australia
Sport in Victoria (Australia) by sport